Ferdinand III may refer to:

 Ferdinand III of Castile (died 1252), the Saint (1199–1252, king from 1217)
 Ferdinand III of Naples, the Catholic (1452–1516, king from 1504) (Ferdinand V of Castile and Ferdinand II of Aragon and of Sicily), husband of Isabella of Castile
 Ferdinand III, Holy Roman Emperor (1608–1657, emperor from 1637)
 Ferdinand III of Sicily (1751–1825, king 1759–1816), (= Ferdinand IV of Naples 1759–1799; 1799–1806; 1815–1816)
 Ferdinand III of Tuscany (1769–1824, grand-duke 1791–1799 and 1814–1824)
 Ferdinand III of Navarre (1784–1833), (Ferdinand VII of Castille)

eo:Ferdinando (regantoj)#Ferdinando la 3-a